Steve Davis (born April 14, 1967) is an American jazz trombonist.

Early life and education
Born in Worcester, Massachusetts, Davis was raised in Binghamton, New York. He grew up with jazz music being played in his household. He studied jazz under Jackie McLean at the University of Hartford Hartt School.

Career 
McLean recommended Davis to Art Blakey, and he joined The Jazz Messengers in 1989. After Blakey's death, Davis joined the Hartt faculty in the early 1990s.

Davis played in Chick Corea's Origin, and recorded with them in the late 1990s and early 2000s. Davis has been a member of the sextet One for All since its inception around 1996. Along with Davis, the band features Eric Alexander, Jim Rotondi, David Hazeltine, John Webber and Joe Farnsworth. Davis led his own bands in New York City in the mid-2000s.

Discography

As leader
 The Moon Knows (Brownstone, 1994)
 The Jaunt (Criss Cross, 1995)
 Dig Deep (Criss Cross, 1996)
 New Terrain w/ Explorers Quintet (Indie release, 1997)
 Crossfire (Criss Cross, 1997)
 Vibe Up (Criss Cross, 1998)
 Portrait in Sound (Stretch, 2000)
 Systems Blue (Criss Cross, 2001)
 Meant to Be (Criss Cross, 2003)
 Alone Together (Mapleshade, 2004)
 Update (Criss Cross, 2006)
 Outlook (Posi-Tone, 2008)
 Images: The Hartford Suite (Posi-Tone, 2009)
 Live at Small's (Smalls Live, 2009)
 Gettin' It Done (Posi-Tone, 2012)
 For Real (Posi-Tone, 2014)
 Say When (Smoke Sessions, 2015)
 Think Ahead (Smoke Sessions, 2017)
 Correlations (Smoke Sessions, 2019)
 Bluesthetic (Smoke Sessions, 2022)

As sideman
With Art Blakey
Chippin' In (Timeless, 1990)
One for All (A&M, 1990)
With Jackie McLean
Rhythm of the Earth (1992, Birdology)
Fire & Love (1997, Toshiba EMI; Blue Note)
With Larry Willis
Blue Fable (HighNote, 2007)
With Others
 Mode for Mabes w/ Eric Alexander (1997, Delmark)
 Beautiful Friendship w/ Joe Farnsworth (1998, Criss Cross)
 Osteology w/ Conrad Herwig (1998, Criss Cross)
 Adama w/ Avishai Cohen (1998, Stretch/Concord)
 Payne's Window w/ Cecil Payne (Delmark, 1999)
 Change w/ Chick Corea & Origin (1999, Stretch/Concord)
 Brand New world w/ Jimmy Greene (1999, BMG)
 Soul Journey w/ Michael Weiss (2003, Sintra)
 Good-Hearted People w/ David Hazeltine (2002, Criss Cross)
 One 4-J w/ Steve Turre (2002, Telarc)
 Spirit of the Horn w/ Slide Hampton's World of Trombones (2002, MCG Jazz)
 American Song w/ Andy Bey (2004, Savoy)
 Dizzy's Business w/ Dizzy Gillespie Alumni All-Star Big Band (2005, MCG Jazz)
 Turn Up the Heath w/ Jimmy Heath Big Band (2006, Planet Arts)
 On the Real Side w/ Freddie Hubbard & New Jazz Composers Octet (2008, Hip Bop)
 New Time, New 'Tet w/ Benny Golson (2008, Concord Jazz)
 Return of the Lineup w/ One for All (2009, Sharp Nine)
 I'm BeBoppin' Too w/ Dizzy Gillespie All-Star Big Band, (2009, Half Note)
 Bringin' It w/ Christian McBride Big Band (2017, Mack Avenue)
 Mabern Plays Mabern w/ Harold Mabern (2018, Smoke Sessions)
 Mabern Plays Coltrane w/ Harold Mabern (2018, Smoke Sessions)
Keep Your Courage by Natalie Merchant (2023, Nonesuch Records)

References

External links 
 Steve Davis at All About Jazz

1967 births
Living people
musicians from Worcester, Massachusetts
American jazz trombonists
Male trombonists
University of Hartford Hartt School alumni
University of Hartford Hartt School faculty
The Jazz Messengers members
21st-century trombonists
American male jazz musicians
One for All (band) members
Christian McBride Big Band members
The New Jazz Composers Octet members
Criss Cross Jazz artists
Posi-Tone Records artists
Mapleshade Records artists
Smoke Sessions Records artists